Oligolophus tridens is a species of harvestman. It is found in central Europe. They typically mature in summer. They are predators, and can reduce aphid populations by up to 97%.  They are known to disperse Melampyrum seeds.

References

Sources
 's Biology Catalog: Phalangiidae

Harvestmen
Arachnids of Europe
Animals described in 1836